The following is a list of episodes of the Travel Channel television program Man v. Food. Adam Richman was the host for the show's first four seasons; after a 5-year hiatus for the show, Casey Webb took over as host.

Series overview

Episodes

Season 1 (2008–2009)

Season 2 (2009)

 *Food did not beat Man outright, as the Doughman was a relay race and not an eating challenge. However, since Man (Adam's team) did not win (finishing 19th), it is technically a win for Food.

Man v. Food Live (2010)

Season 3 (2010)

Season 4: Man v. Food Nation (2011–2012)

 *This was a head-to-head contest rather than a challenge, but since Cassie did not win the contest (eating 26 fritters, whereas the winner ate 42), it is technically a win for Food.
 **Jamil was unable to finish his challenge, but Jamal finished his, and this counted as a win.

Season 5 (2017)

Season 6 (2017–2018)

Season 7 (2018)

Season 8 (2019-2020)

Season 9 (2021-2022)

Season 10 (2022)

Lists of reality television series episodes
Man v. Food